35th North Skateshop, or simply 35th North, is a skate shop in Seattle, in the U.S. state of Washington.

History 

Owner Tony Croghan opened 35th North in Seattle's University District in 2001. The business has operated from Pike and 11th since 2003.

Croghan participated in a contest to build DIY skate spots. In 2017, the city of Seattle sued 35th North for creating a bowl on Duck Island in Green Lake Park, which the city considers a wildlife habitat. A $30,000 settlement was reached in 2018.

Reception 
The Not for Tourists Guide to Seattle says the shop has a "comprehensive selection of goods for co-ed skaters". In 2018, Tobias Coughlin-Bogue of Curbed Seattle called 35th North Seattle's "main skate shop". Thrasher has described the business as "central Seattle's longest standing core shop". Esther Hershkovits included the business in Red Bull's 2022 list of the city's three best skate shops.

References

External links

 

2001 establishments in Washington (state)
American companies established in 2001
Capitol Hill, Seattle
Skateboarding